Georgie Torres Dougherty (born October 15, 1957) is an American former professional basketball player. He is a well known former BSN basketball player. Torres broke the record for the most points scored in a career at that league, with over 15,800 points scored. He was the first player to reach that number of points. The Puerto Rican professional basketball league only holds 30 to 34 games each year; players who score over 5,000 career points there are usually considered to be among the great Puerto Rican basketball players.

Torres debuted in the BSN in 1975, with the "Cariduros de Fajardo". Torres became a household name in Puerto Rico while with that team. He led the league in points scored from 1984 to 1987. Despite helping the Cariduros to the playoffs multiple times during his era there, the Cariduros failed to win a championship.

Later on, Torres went on to play with the "Mets de Guaynabo" alongside Mario Morales. After his stay with the Mets, Torres played for the Vaqueros de Bayamon with whom he won his first two championships in 1995 and 1996 and the "Gallitos de Isabela", before landing with the "Cangrejeros de Santurce". With the Crabbers, Torres teamed up along with players such as José Ortiz, Carlos Arroyo, Rolando Hourruitiner and Sharif Fajardo to win the league's championship in 1999.

Also in 1999, he reached the milestone of 15,500 points.

Torres was a longtime member of the Puerto Rican national basketball team. Due to different reasons, however, the 1996 Summer Olympics in Atlanta, Georgia were the only Olympic Games he was able to attend.

See also
List of Puerto Ricans

References

External links
 Statistics in BSN

1957 births
Living people
Baloncesto Superior Nacional players
Basketball players at the 1979 Pan American Games
Basketball players at the 1996 Summer Olympics
Basketball players from New York City
Billings Volcanos players
Olympic basketball players of Puerto Rico
Pan American Games silver medalists for Puerto Rico
Puerto Rican men's basketball players
1978 FIBA World Championship players
1990 FIBA World Championship players
Puerto Rico men's national basketball team players
Rochester Zeniths players
Southern Nazarene Crimson Storm men's basketball players
Sportspeople from Brooklyn
Utah Jazz draft picks
Pan American Games medalists in basketball
Small forwards
Shooting guards
Medalists at the 1979 Pan American Games